Matt Sherratt is an English professional rugby union coach. He is currently the backs coach of Worcester Warriors who play in the Premiership Rugby competition. He had previously been backs coach at the Ospreys and Cardiff Blues. During the 2019–20 Pro14 he took over from Allen Clarke as head coach of the Ospreys on an interim basis alongside Carl Hogg. Previously he had worked in England at Worcester Warriors and Bristol Bears, while he also worked for the Rugby Football Union.

References

Living people
English rugby union coaches
Ospreys (rugby union) coaches
Year of birth missing (living people)